Bait: Off-Color Stories for You to Color is a 2016 short story collection and coloring book novel by Chuck Palahniuk.

Overview
Short story collection of eight stories and original illustrations by comic book artists to color.

References

External links
 Chuck Palahniuk.Net section for Bait

2016 short story collections
Books by Chuck Palahniuk
Coloring books
English-language books
American short story collections
Dark Horse Books books